Two Japanese destroyers have been named Hinoki:

 , a  launched in 1916 and broken up in 1940
 , a  launched in 1944 and sunk in 1945

Imperial Japanese Navy ship names
Japanese Navy ship names